Capsule Soup (カプセル・スープ) is an EP by The Mad Capsule Markets. The band starts to show experimentation with this release, such as the use of samplers. "Bach Sleeps" is a cover version of Bach's Fugue for organ in G minor.

Track listing
"Bach Sleeps." – 1:59
 – 3:01
"G・M・J・P" – 4:22
 – 3:21
 – 3:11
"Jesus Is Dead." – 4:52

Charts

References

The Mad Capsule Markets albums
1992 EPs